Johan Durst (born 18 March 1991) is a field hockey player from Australia, who plays as a goalkeeper.

Personal life
Johan Durst was born and raised in Canterbury, Victoria. He completed a Bachelor of Commerce at Deakin University.

Career

Domestic hockey
From 2015 until 2018, Durst was a member of the Victorian Vikings team in the Australian Hockey League.

In 2019, Durst was a member of the HC Melbourne team for the inaugural season of the Sultana Bran Hockey One League.

National teams

Under–21
Johan Durst made his debut for Australia in 2011, where he was a member of the Under–21 team at the Sultan of Johor Cup in Johor Bahru. At the tournament, he won a silver medal.

Kookaburras
Durst was named in the national squad for the first time in 2018, following strong performances for Victoria in the AHL. He made his debut for the Kookaburras later that year in a test series against Germany in Moers. This was followed immediately by a gold medal at the FIH Champions Trophy in Breda.

Since his debut Durst has been a regular inclusion in the national squad, despite not making many appearances.

References

External links
 
 
 

1991 births
Living people
Male field hockey goalkeepers
Australian male field hockey players
Field hockey players at the 2022 Commonwealth Games
Commonwealth Games gold medallists for Australia
Commonwealth Games medallists in field hockey
20th-century Australian people
21st-century Australian people
People from Canterbury, Victoria
Deakin University alumni
Field hockey players from Melbourne
2023 Men's FIH Hockey World Cup players
Medallists at the 2022 Commonwealth Games